The 1982 Philippine Basketball Association (PBA) Reinforced Filipino Conference was the first conference of the 1982 PBA season. It started on March 7 and ended on July 13, 1982. The tournament is an Import-laden format, which requires an import with the height limit of 6"5' and below for each team.

Format
The following format was observed for the duration of the tournament:
 The eight participating teams were divided into two groups; teams in the same group played each other twice, while in the other group three times, totalling 18 games.
 A series of best-of-three quarterfinals, best-of-five semifinals, and the first-ever best-of-seven championship series will determine the PBA First Conference champion.

Elimination round

Bracket

Quarterfinals

(3) Gilbey's Gin vs. (6) U/Tex

Bogs Adornado scored four straight points in the final 30 seconds, including two charities to seal the win and eliminated the Gins.

(4) Toyota vs. (5) Yco-Tanduay

Arnie Tuadles and Donnie Ray Koonce took over in the third quarter and gave Toyota a 95-77 advantage. The Super Corollas trailed by as many as 15 points in the first half.

Semifinals

(1) San Miguel vs. (6) U/Tex

(2) Crispa vs. (4) Toyota

Donnie Ray Koonce scored eight crucial points in a 10-2 Toyota run to give the Super Corollas a 107-99 lead in the last two minutes of the deciding fifth game of their semifinal series. Crispa fought back on a five-point burst by Atoy Co to trim down Toyota's margin to three, 104-107, but Ramon Fernandez fired the last two of his 25 points on a hard drive for a 109-104 Toyota lead with 52 seconds left.

Finals

References

PBA Reinforced Conference
Reinforced Filipino Conference